Ragnar "Ragge" Blom (7 February 1921 – 10 February 2010) was a Swedish football and bandy player, known for representing Hammarby IF and AIK in both sports.

Athletic career

Football
In 1936, at age 15, Blom made his senior debut for local club Avesta IF. At the beginning of World War II, Blom joined the Swedish Armed Forces and moved to Stockholm, where he continued to play football with IK Sture in the Swedish lower divisions.

At IK Sture, Blom impressed and got discovered by Per Kaufeldt, a former Swedish national player and current manager of Hammarby IF. In 1943, he made his debut for the club in Division 2, Sweden's second tier. Blom impressed at Hammarby and became known as a hard-working, fast-paced and versatile right-back, who also was a set piece specialist.

In 1946, Blom transferred to rivals AIK and made his debut in Allsvenskan, Sweden's top tier, in a 2–1 win against Degerfors IF on 8 September. He would, however, only make 3 appearances for the side in total, before leaving the club for Sundbybergs IK in the lower divisions.

In 1950, Blom returned to Hammarby IF. Hammarby got promoted back to Allsvenskan after winning the 1953–1954 Division 2 season, where the club went unbeaten whilst using only 15 players. Blom made 10 appearances for the club throughout the season, before announcing his retirement from football.

Bandy
Blom was also a prominent bandy player and represented both Hammarby IF and AIK in Allsvenskan, Sweden's first tier. He also played bandy with the third big club from Stockholm, Djurgårdens IF.

He returned to Hammarby IF after his playing career, being a part of their backroom staff between 1957–1963 and 1967–1971.

References

Works cited

 

1921 births
2000 deaths
Association football defenders
Swedish footballers
Swedish bandy players
Hammarby Fotboll players
Hammarby IF Bandy players
AIK Bandy players
Djurgårdens IF Bandy players
AIK Fotboll players
Allsvenskan players
People from Avesta Municipality
Sportspeople from Dalarna County